Steven Timothy Peterson (born May 29, 1990) is an American professional mixed martial artist. Peterson currently competes in the Featherweight division for the Ultimate Fighting Championship (UFC). A professional competitor since 2010, Peterson has also competed for Bellator Fighting Championships and the Legacy Fighting Alliance.

Mixed martial arts career

Early career
Peterson made his Bellator Fighting Championships debut on September 2, 2010 at Bellator 27 against Ernest de la Cruz, winning via unanimous decision.

Peterson made his second and final appearance in Bellator on March 23, 2012 against Chris Jones at Bellator 62, losing via split decision. Peterson competed extensively in both Legacy FC and Legacy Fighting Alliance, winning the Legacy FC Bantamweight title at Legacy FC 56 vs. Manny Vasquez via rear-naked choke. He lost a title unification bout at LFA 1 against Leandro Higo via unanimous decision.

Dana White Tuesday Night Contender Series
Peterson competed on Dana White's Contender Series 7  for a chance at a UFC contract on August 22, 2017 against Benito Lopez, losing via split decision.

Ultimate Fighting Championship
Peterson made his UFC debut at UFC Fight Night 126 on February 18, 2018 against Humberto Bandenay. However, due to a visa issue for Bandenay, he was replaced by Brandon Davis. Peterson lost the fight via unanimous decision. This fight earned him the Fight of the Night award.

Peterson’s next bout was at The Ultimate Fighter: Undefeated Finale on July 6, 2018 against Matt Bessette. He won the fight via split decision.

Peterson faced Luis Peña on March 23, 2019 at UFC Fight Night 148. At the weigh-ins, Peña weighed in at 148.5 lbs, 2.5 pounds over the featherweight non-title fight limit of 146 lbs. Peña  was fined 30% of his fight purse and the bout proceed at catchweight. Peterson lost the fight via unanimous decision. Peterson signed a new, four-fight contract with the UFC after the fight.

Peterson faced Alex Caceres on July 20, 2019 at UFC on ESPN 4. He lost the fight via unanimous decision.

Peterson faced Martín Bravo on September 21, 2019 at UFC on ESPN+ 17. Peterson won the fight by knockout via a spinning back fist in the second round. This win earn him the Performance of the Night award. Peterson said of his knockout, "I went to evade his spinning backfist and it just naturally came because I made the same step and it was right after I jabbed when he did it. The jab was the perfect setup. I was just in a flow state when I did it. Everything came natural when I landed that backfist."

Peterson was expected to face Aalon Cruz on February 29, 2020 at UFC Fight Night 169.  However, Peterson was pulled from the event for an undisclosed reason, and he was replaced by promotional newcomer Spike Carlyle.

Peterson was scheduled to meet Seung Woo Choi on February 6, 2021 at UFC Fight Night 184. However, Peterson pulled out of the fight on January 15 due to an injury, and he was replaced by promotional newcomer Collin Anglin.

Peterson faced Chase Hooper on June 12, 2021 at UFC 263. At the weigh-ins, Peterson weighed in at 148.5 pounds, two and a half pounds over the featherweight non-title fight limit. The bout proceeded at catchweight and he was fined 20% of his purse, which went go to his opponent Hooper. Peterson won the fight via unanimous decision.

Peterson faced Julian Erosa on February 5, 2022 at UFC Fight Night 200. At the weigh-ins, Peterson weighed in at 149 pounds, three pounds over the featherweight non-title fight limit. The bout proceededed at catchweight and Peterson was fined 30% of his purse, which went to his opponent. He lost the fight via split decision. 13 out of 18 media scores gave it to Erosa. This fight earned him the Fight of the Night award, but Peterson was unable to collect the bonus due to his weight miss. As a result, his award was given to Erosa.

Peterson is expected to return on March 25, 2023 at UFC on ESPN 43 in San Antonio, Texas against Lucas Alexander.

Championships and achievements
Ultimate Fighting Championship
Performance of the Night (One time) 
Fight of the Night (Two times) 
MMAJunkie.com
2019 September Knockout of the Month vs. Martín Bravo

Mixed martial arts record

|Loss
|align=center|19–10
|Julian Erosa
|Decision (split)
|UFC Fight Night: Hermansson vs. Strickland
| 
|align=center|3
|align=center|5:00
|Las Vegas, Nevada, United States
|
|-
|Win
|align=center|19–9
|Chase Hooper
|Decision (unanimous)
|UFC 263
|
|align=center|3
|align=center|5:00
|Glendale, Arizona, United States
|
|-
|Win
|align=center|18–9
|Martín Bravo
|KO (spinning back fist)
|UFC Fight Night: Rodríguez vs. Stephens 
|
|align=center|2
|align=center|1:31
|Mexico City, Mexico
|
|-
|Loss
|align=center|17–9
|Alex Caceres
|Decision (unanimous)
|UFC on ESPN: dos Anjos vs. Edwards 
|
|align=center|3
|align=center|5:00
|San Antonio, Texas, United States
|
|-
|Loss
|align=center|17–8
|Luis Peña
|Decision (unanimous) 
|UFC Fight Night: Thompson vs. Pettis 
|
|align=center|3
|align=center|5:00
|Nashville, Tennessee, United States
|
|-
| Win
| align=center| 17–7
| Matt Bessette
| Decision (split)
| The Ultimate Fighter: Undefeated Finale
| 
| align=center| 3
| align=center| 5:00
| Las Vegas, Nevada, United States
| 
|-
| Loss
| align=center| 16–7
| Brandon Davis
| Decision (unanimous)
| UFC Fight Night: Cowboy vs. Medeiros
| 
| align=center| 3
| align=center| 5:00
| Austin, Texas, United States
|
|-
| Win
| align=center| 16–6
| Dustin Winter
| TKO (punches)
| LFA 28
| 
| align=center| 2
| align=center| 2:38
| Dallas, Texas, United States
|
|-
| Loss
| align=center| 15–6
| Benito Lopez
| Decision (split)
| Dana White's Contender Series 7 
| 
| align=center| 3
| align=center| 5:00
| Las Vegas, Nevada, United States
| 
|-
| Win
| align=center| 15–5
| Ryan Hollis
| Submission (rear-naked choke)
| LFA 16
| 
| align=center| 2
| align=center| 1:43
| Dallas, Texas, United States
|
|-
| Loss
| align=center| 14–5
| Leandro Higo
| Decision (unanimous)
| LFA 1
| 
| align=center| 5
| align=center| 5:00
| Dallas, Texas, United States
|
|-
| Win
| align=center| 14-4
| Manny Vasquez
| Technical Submission (rear-naked choke)
| Legacy FC 56
| 
| align=center| 4
| align=center| 3:08
| Dallas, Texas, United States
|
|-
| Win
| align=center| 13-4
|Irwin Rivera
| Decision (unanimous)
| Legacy FC 46
| 
| align=center| 3
| align=center| 5:00
| Allen, Texas, United States
| 
|-
| Win
| align=center| 12-4
| Caio Machado
| Submission (guillotine choke)
| Legacy FC 38
| 
| align=center| 1
| align=center| 3:55
| Allen, Texas, United States
| 
|-
|Win
|align=center|11–4
|Ray Rodriguez
|Decision (unanimous)
|Legacy FC 33
|
|align=center|3
|align=center|5:00
|Allen, Texas, United States
|
|-
|Win
|align=center|10-4
|Ray Rodriguez
|TKO
|Legacy FC 28 
|
|align=center|2
|align=center|n/a
|Arlington, Texas, United States
|
|-
|Win
|align=center|9–4
|Nelson Salas
|TKO (punches)
|Xtreme Knockout 19 
|
|align=center|4
|align=center|1:58
|Dallas, Texas, United States
|
|-
| Loss
| align=center| 8–4 
| George Pacurariu
| KO (punch)
| Legacy FC 19
| 
| align=center| 1
| align=center| 3:42
| Dallas, Texas, United States
| 
|-
| Loss
| align=center| 8–3
| Matt Hobar
| Decision (majority)
| Legacy FC 16
| 
| align=center| 3
| align=center| 5:00
| Dallas, Texas, United States
| 
|-
| Win
| align=center| 8–2
| Cody Williams
| Submission (omoplata)
| Legacy FC 14
| 
| align=center| 2
| align=center| 4:46
| Houston, Texas, United States
|
|-
| Win
| align=center| 7–2
| Matt Hobar
| TKO (arm injury)
| Legacy FC 13
| 
| align=center| 1
| align=center| 4:04
| Dallas, Texas, United States
| 
|-
| Loss
| align=center| 6–2
| Chris Jones
| Decision (split)
| Bellator 62
| 
| align=center| 3
| align=center| 5:00
| Laredo, Texas, United States
| 
|-
| Win
| align=center| 6–1
| Steve Garcia
| Submission (guillotine choke)
| Legacy FC 8
| 
| align=center| 1
| align=center| 1:40
| Houston, Texas, United States
| 
|-
| Win
| align=center| 5–1
| Alex Russ
| Submission (rear-naked choke)
| Xtreme Knockout 11
| 
| align=center| 1
| align=center| 1:57
| Arlington, Texas, United States
| 
|-
| Win
| align=center| 4–1
| Douglas Frey
| Decision (majority)
| Xtreme Knockout 10
| 
| align=center| 4
| align=center| 1:11
| Arlington, Texas, United States
| 
|-
| Win
| align=center| 3–1
| Quaint Kempf
| Submission (armbar)
| Xtreme Knockout 9
| 
| align=center| 1
| align=center| 0:24
| Arlington, Texas, United States
| 
|-
| Loss
| align=center| 2–1
| Brad Mitchell
| Decision (unanimous) 
| Xtreme Knockout 8
| 
| align=center| 3
| align=center| 3:00
| Arlington, Texas, United States
| 
|-
| Win
| align=center| 2–0
| Ernest de la Cruz
| Decision (unanimous) 
| Bellator 27
| 
| align=center| 3
| align=center| 3:00
| San Antonio, Texas, United States
| 
|-
| Win
| align=center| 1–0
| Marcus Dupar
| Submission (armbar)
| TCF: Puro Combate 1
| 
| align=center| 3
| align=center| 2:26
| Houston, Texas, United States
| 
|-

See also
 List of current UFC fighters
 List of male mixed martial artists

References

External links
 
 

American male mixed martial artists
1990 births
Living people
Featherweight mixed martial artists
Bantamweight mixed martial artists
Mixed martial artists utilizing Muay Thai
Mixed martial artists utilizing Brazilian jiu-jitsu
Mixed martial artists from Texas
Ultimate Fighting Championship male fighters
American Muay Thai practitioners
American practitioners of Brazilian jiu-jitsu